Chaffee is a city in Scott County, Missouri, United States. The population was 2,955 at the 2010 census.

History 
Chaffee was platted in 1905, and named after Adna Chaffee, an officer in the Spanish–American War. A post office called Chaffee has been in operation since 1905.

Geography
Chaffee is located at  (37.179706, -89.659353).

Demographics

2010 census
As of the census of 2010, there were 2,955 people, 1,204 households, and 762 families living in the city. The racial makeup of the city was 97.83% White, 0.51% Black or African American, 0.20% Native American, 0.10% Asian, 0.07% from other races, and 1.29% from two or more races. Hispanic or Latino people of any race were 1.25% of the population.

There were 1,204 households, of which 34.7% had children under the age of 18 living with them, 45.1% were married couples living together, 12.5% had a female householder with no husband present, 5.7% had a male householder with no wife present, and 36.7% were non-families. 33.0% of all households were made up of individuals, and 16.3% had someone living alone who was 65 years of age or older. The average household size was 2.41 and the average family size was 3.02.

The median age in the city was 36.4 years. 26.1% of residents were under the age of 18; 8.7% were between the ages of 18 and 24; 24.7% were from 25 to 44; 23.8% were from 45 to 64; and 16.8% were 65 years of age or older. The gender makeup of the city was 48.2% male and 51.8% female.

The per capita income for the city was $20,978. About 24.4% of families and 22.4% of the population were below the poverty line, including 35.9% of those under age 18 and 16.5% of those age 65 or over.

2000 census
As of the census of 2000, there were 3,044 people, 1,267 households, and 824 families living in the city. The population density was 1,715.8 people per square mile (664.0/km2). There were 1,378 housing units at an average density of 776.7 per square mile (300.6/km2). The racial makeup of the city was 98.46% White, 0.07% African American, 0.23% Native American, 0.07% Asian, 0.39% from other races, and 0.79% from two or more races. Hispanic or Latino people of any race were 1.18% of the population.

There were 1,267 households, out of which 32.3% had children under the age of 18 living with them, 46.8% were married couples living together, 15.1% had a female householder with no husband present, and 34.9% were non-families. 32.7% of all households were made up of individuals, and 18.4% had someone living alone who was 65 years of age or older. The average household size was 2.36 and the average family size was 2.96.

In the city the population was spread out, with 25.2% under the age of 18, 9.9% from 18 to 24, 25.1% from 25 to 44, 21.4% from 45 to 64, and 18.4% who were 65 years of age or older. The median age was 38 years. For every 100 females there were 85.8 males. For every 100 females age 18 and over, there were 78.6 males.

The median income for a household in the city was $27,076, and the median income for a family was $34,671. Males had a median income of $27,576 versus $18,873 for females. The per capita income for the city was $16,554. About 12.9% of families and 16.2% of the population were below the poverty line, including 21.4% of those under age 18 and 13.7% of those age 65 or over.

Education
Chaffee R-II School District operates one elementary school and Chaffee Jr.-Sr. High School.

The town has a lending library, the Chaffee Public Library.

Economy
For many years, the town's economy was centered on textile manufacturing. Because large amounts of cotton are produced by southeast Missouri farmers, and owing to the town's location near the Mississippi River, it made sense to process the cotton locally. However, in the late 1990s and early 2000s, the town's economy was devastated by factory closings. The Columbia Sportswear factory and the Florsheim Shoe Company announced that they were idling their plants and laying off workers. Nearly 450 jobs were lost in a period of six months. This was compounded by the closure of previous factories such as the Thorngate Clothing Company, which idled its plant in 1996.  Out of a population of just 3000 people, this amounted to losing over 60% of the town's employment base.

References

External links
 Historic maps of Chaffee in the Sanborn Maps of Missouri Collection at the University of Missouri

Cities in Scott County, Missouri
Cities in Missouri